The Aid to Russia Fund  was begun in 1941 by the Joint War Organisation to assist Russians cope with the deprivations caused by Hitler's advance. Mrs Clementine Churchill was appointed chairman. Around £8 million (200 million in modern funds) was raised over the course of the war, in part from contributions from the Penny-a-Week Fund. The scheme, introduced in 1939, deducted a penny from the weekly salaries of about 1,400,000 employees in 15,000 firms. The money raised helped pay for warm clothing and medical supplies. The Joint War Organisation worked with the Trades Union Congress, the National Council of Labour and the Mineworkers Federation to supply these items. In addition to portable X-ray units, motor X-ray units and ambulances, the following items were sent: blankets, clothes, medicines, medical equipment, and first aid kits etc.

References

External links
 Aid To Russia Fund
 London At War.  Philip Ziegler, 2002 p. 276

Charities based in the United Kingdom